And Hell Will Follow Me is the debut album by American metal band A Pale Horse Named Death. The album was originally released in 2010 in a slightly different, glossy digipak with the booklet signed by Sal. The wide release came out in 2011.

Track listing

 "And Hell Will Follow Me" – 0:57
 "As Black as My Heart" – 4:32
 "To Die in Your Arms" – 3:36
 "Heroin Train" – 3:10
 "Devil in the Closet" – 3:42
 "Cracks in the Walls" – 5:40
 "Bad Dream" – 2:06
 "Bath in My Blood (Schizophrenia in Me)" – 2:25
 "Pill Head" – 5:38
 "Meet the Wolf" – 5:27
 "Serial Killer" – 4:38
 "Pickup Truck" – 3:38 (Vinyl version bonus track)
 "When Crows Descend upon You" – 4:11
 "Die Alone" – 7:35

Notes
 The vinyl version of the album features an exclusive bonus track titled "Pickup Truck" (3:38) between "Serial Killer" and "When Crows Descend upon You".

Reception

Jonathan Barkan of Bloody Disgusting wrote "And Hell Will Follow Me is a throwback to an era when rock and metal wasn't afraid to face, and even laud, the darkness that lurked behind the scenes".

Chris Storey of With Guitars suggested that "If in your CD collection you own albums by the likes of Alice in Chains [and] Down and Clutch, then this album is for you".

References

External links
 Official band website

2011 debut albums
A Pale Horse Named Death albums